Baron Browning (born February 19, 1999) is an American football linebacker for the Denver Broncos of the National Football League (NFL). He played college football at Ohio State.

Early years
Browning attended Kennedale High School in Kennedale, Texas. A five star recruit, he played in the 2017 U.S. Army All American Bowl and was a finalist for the Butkus Award. He committed to Ohio State University to play college football.

College career
As a true freshman at Ohio State in 2017, Browning played in 12 games and had 14 tackles. He started three of 12 games his sophomore year in 2018, recording 24 tackles and one sack. He again played in 12 games his junior year in 2019, finishing with 43 tackles and five sacks. Browning returned to Ohio State for his senior year in 2020 and was moved from middle linebacker to outside linebacker.

Professional career

Browning was drafted by the Denver Broncos in the third round, 105th overall, of the 2021 NFL Draft. He signed his four-year rookie contract with Denver on July 22, 2021.

References

External links
Ohio State Buckeyes bio

Living people
Players of American football from Fort Worth, Texas
American football linebackers
Ohio State Buckeyes football players
Denver Broncos players
1999 births